The Sheriff of Angus (alternatively the Sheriff of Forfar) was historically the royal official responsible for enforcing law and order in Angus, Scotland and bringing criminals to justice.

Prior to 1748 most sheriffdoms, was held on a hereditary basis. From that date, following the Jacobite uprising of 1745, they were replaced by salaried sheriff-deputes, qualified advocates who were members of the Scottish Bar.

After the merger of sheriffdoms in 1934 the post became that of the Sheriff of Perth and Angus.

Sheriffs of Forfar 

 William de Monte Alto
 William Comyn, Lord of Badenoch (1195-1211)
 Hugh Cameron (1214-1219)
 Thomas Malherb (1227)
 John Fenton (1261)
 Robert Mowat (1261-1264)
 John Fenton (1266)
 Matthew le Chen (1272)
 Alexander de Lamberton
 David de Bethune (1290)
 Henry de Prestoun (1304)
 John de Pollock (1305)
 William de Airth (1305)
 John de Traquair (1328)
 Robert Ramsay (1340)
 John Octerlony (1342)
 Robert Ramsay (1359)
 Malcolm Ramsay (1365)
 Walter Ogilvy of Auchterhouse (-1391)
 Duncan Lighton - 1391 - Deputy
 Alexander Ogilvy (1400)
 Patrick Ogilvy (1428)
 Walter Ogilvy (1434)
 Alexander Ogilvy of Auchterhouse (1454)
 Thomas Fenton - 1454 - Deputy
 David Guthrie, (1457–)
 David Lindsay, 5th Earl of Crawford (1474)
Alexander Lindsay - 1483 - Deputy
John Ramsay of Teling (1497)
 Patrick Gray, 4th Lord Gray, 1541–?1584 (died 1584)
 Patrick Maule of Panmure (1632)

Sheriffs-Depute (1748)
George Broun, 1748–1753 
 John Campbell of Stonefield (Lord Stonefield), 1753– 
 Patrick Chalmers, 1769–1807 
 Adam Duff, 1807–1819 
 James L'Amy, 1819–1854 
 Alexander Currie, 1854 
 Alexander Stuart Logan 1854-1862 
 Frederick Lewis Maitland Heriot, 1862–1881 
 John Comrie Thomson, 1885–1898
 Henry Johnston, 1898–1905 
 James Ferguson KC, 1905–1917
 John Mckie Lees KB KC, 1917–1923
 Alexander Munro MacRobert KC, 1923–1924
 Sir George Morton, 1924–1932 
 Daniel Patterson Blades, 1932–1934 
 ''For sheriffs after 1934 see Sheriff of Perth and Angus.

See also
 Historical development of Scottish sheriffdoms

References 

Sheriff courts
Sheriff
sheriff